Intevac, Inc. (NASDAQ: IVAC) is a producer of thin film deposition systems and equipment for making hard disk drives. It is headquartered in Santa Clara, California in Silicon Valley. The company also has  offices in China, Malaysia and Singapore.

Founded in 1991 as a spin-off from Varian Associates, Intevac went public in 1995. The company reported revenues of $13.8 million in the first half of 2022.

References

External links
 Intevac, Inc. official website
 Google Finance - Intevac, Inc.
 Yahoo! Intevac, Inc. Company Profile

Manufacturing companies established in 1991
1991 establishments in California
Manufacturers of industrial automation
Companies based in Santa Clara, California